Edoardo Bencivenga (Naples, ? – Rome, June 6, 1934) was an Italian film director; Bencivegna started in 1907 filming his first short film Raffaello e la Fornarina , in his career he made over 60 films, the last one in 1922.

Filmography 
 Raffaello e la Fornarina – short film (1907)
 L'uomo dalla testa dura (1908)
 Raffaello Sanzio e la fornarina (1909)
 L'ignota – short film (1910) – 
 Il serpe – short film (1910)
 Il barone Lagarde – short film (1910) – 
 Maria Bricca (1910)
 I cavalieri della morte – short film (1910) – 
 L'innocente (1911)
 Pietà di mamma – short film (1911)
 Il processo Clémenceau (1912)
 Se fossi Re! – short film (1912)
 La nave – short film (1912) – come Eduardo Bencivenga
 Il fischio della sirena – short film (1912)
 Il ragno – short film (1913)
 Cuor di poeta – short film (1913)
 L'epopea napoleonica (1914)
 Fata Morgana – short film (1914)
 La du Barry (1914)
 DuBarry (1915)
 L'onore di morire (1915)
 Cuore ed arte (1915)
 Il dubbio – short film (1915)
 Savoia, urrah! – short film (1915)
 Guerra redentrice (1915)
 Alla bajonetta!.. (1915) – as Eduardo Bencivenga
 Eroismo di madre – cortometraggio (1915)
 Il sacrificio del nonno – short film (1915)
 Il ridicolo (1916)
 Don Giovanni (1916 film) (1916)
 Trama sventata (1916)
 Il nemico occulto (1916)
 Il medaglione – short film (1916)
 Ferréol (film 1916) (1916)
 L'anello di Pierrot (1917)
 La figlia di Jorio (1917 film) (1917)
 Pazzia contagiosa – short film (1917)
 Le due orfanelle (1918 film) (1918)
 P.L.M. ossia l'assassinio della Paris-Lyon-Mediterranée (1918)
 Mariute (1918)
 L'orgoglio (1918)
 Voca e canta – short film (1918)
 L'ira (1918)
 Fiamme avvolgenti (1918)
 L'invidia (1919)
 Sullivan (1919)
 Il cieco (1919)
 La piovra (1919)
 La leggenda dei tre fiori (1919)
 La lussuria (1919)
 L'onore della famiglia (1919)
 La morte civile (1919)
 La colpa vendica la colpa (1919)
 Il cuore di Roma (1919)
 La donna dai capelli d'oro (1920)
 La follia del giuoco (1920)
 Fino alla tenebra (1920)
 Il marito perduto (1920)
 La donna, il diavolo, il tempo (1921)
 La moglie di sua eccellenza (film 1921) (1921)
 Il figlio di Coralie (1921)
 Hermione (1921 film) (1921)
 Dionisia (1921 film) (1921)
 Il dubbio (1921)
 Non è resurrezione senza morte (1922)

References

 

1934 deaths
Italian film directors
Silent film directors
Year of birth missing